Ulla Mänttäri is a Finnish orienteering competitor. She received a bronze medal in the relay event at the 1989 World Orienteering Championships in Skövde, together with Marja Liisa Portin, Annika Viilo and Eija Koskivaara.

See also
 Finnish orienteers
 List of orienteers
 List of orienteering events

References

Year of birth missing (living people)
Living people
Finnish orienteers
Female orienteers
Foot orienteers
World Orienteering Championships medalists